The 2019 Worlds Collide was the inaugural Worlds Collide professional wrestling streaming event produced by WWE. It was held for wrestlers from the promotion's NXT, NXT UK, and 205 Live brand divisions. The event took place on January 26 and 27, 2019, at the Phoenix Convention Center in Phoenix, Arizona as part of that year's Royal Rumble weekend. The event aired on tape delay on the WWE Network as one single event on February 2, 2019.

The event featured the 15-man Worlds Collide tournament, with the wrestlers being equally divided amongst the NXT, NXT UK, and 205 Live rosters. The prize was a championship match of the winner's choice. The tournament was won by NXT's Velveteen Dream, who chose to challenge Johnny Gargano for the NXT North American Championship.

Production

Background
In early January 2019, WWE announced that they would be hosting an interbrand tournament to take place during the weekend of that year's Royal Rumble pay-per-view and would stream on the WWE Network. The tournament was a two-day event, held on January 26 and 27 at the Phoenix Convention Center in Phoenix, Arizona, and aired on tape delay on February 2. The event hosted a 15-man single-elimination tournament, called the Worlds Collide Tournament, which was evenly divided between wrestlers from the NXT, NXT UK, and 205 Live brands. The winner of the tournament received a future match for a championship of their choice, with the choices being the NXT Championship, the NXT North American Championship, the WWE United Kingdom Championship, and the WWE Cruiserweight Championship (the latter only being an option if the winner was within the 205 lb. weight limit).

Storylines

The card included matches that resulted from scripted storylines, where wrestlers portrayed villains, heroes, or less distinguishable characters in scripted events that built tension and culminated in a wrestling match or series of matches. Results were predetermined by WWE's writers on the 205 Live, NXT, and NXT UK brands, with storylines produced on WWE's weekly television shows, NXT, NXT UK, and the cruiserweight-exclusive 205 Live.

On January 10, a 15-man battle royal was announced for the event. The order of elimination in the battle royal determined the first-round matches for the Worlds Collide tournament. The winner of the battle royal would receive a bye to the second-round.

Participants
 – NXT
 – NXT UK
 – 205 Live

Tournament bracket

Aftermath
The "Worlds Collide" name was subsequently adopted for a WWE Network series that aired in April 2019. During the Royal Rumble 2020 weekend announcements, WWE revealed that a second Worlds Collide event would air live on the WWE Network on January 25, 2020, and held at the Toyota Center in Houston, Texas, though unlike the 2019 event, it would only feature the NXT and NXT UK brands and not also 205 Live (which was later dissolved in February 2022). Also unlike the 2019 event, there was not a Worlds Collide Tournament with a future championship opportunity at stake. Instead, the card's matches were interbrand matches pitting wrestlers from NXT against those from NXT UK.

Results

January 26

January 27

References

2019 WWE Network events
2019 in Arizona
Professional wrestling in Phoenix, Arizona
Events in Phoenix, Arizona
January 2019 events in the United States
WWE tournaments
WWE 205 Live
WWE NXT
NXT UK
2019